Harry Campbell may refer to:
Harry Campbell (footballer, born 1867) (1867–1915), Scottish footballer
Harry Campbell (footballer, born 1995), football goalkeeper
Harry Campbell (boxer) (1938–1961), American lightweight boxer
Harry Campbell (physician) (1860–1938), British physician
"Harry Campbell and the Heavies", a song by Billy Connolly from the album Transatlantic Years

See also
Henry Campbell (disambiguation)
Harold Campbell (1888–1969), Royal equerry
Harold Campbell (co-operator) (1913–2002), British co-operative activist